Gita Rana (born 21 September 1996) is a Nepalese footballer who plays as a defender for Nepalese club Armed Police Force Club and the Nepal national team.

Early life 
Gita Rana was born to Mr. Ram Bahadur Rana and Mrs. Man Maya Rana who is an inhabitant of Bardiya.

Style of play 
She is generally deployed as center back in the 4-4-2 formation but can act as play maker (She wears the No-12 Shirt in national team) in 3-4-3 or 4-5-1 formation just ahead the goalkeeper.

International career 
Rana made her international debut against Malaysia in a friendly match on 2016.

Career Statistics

International Level Participation

References

External links
 

1996 births
Living people
Nepalese women's footballers
Women's association football defenders
Nepal A.P.F. Club players
Nepal women's international footballers